Trevor Robson (born 4 January 1959) is an English former footballer.

Career
Robson graduated through the Port Vale youth team and made his Third Division debut as a substitute; replacing Colin Tartt at Vale Park in a 1–1 draw with Halifax Town on 17 April 1976. He signed as a professional in January 1977, but was not selected again and was instead given a free transfer by manager Roy Sproson in May 1977.

Career statistics
Source:

References

1959 births
Living people
Footballers from Stoke-on-Trent
English footballers
Association football defenders
Port Vale F.C. players
English Football League players